Micah Balfour (born 18 July 1978) is an English actor. He played PC Benjamin Gayle in the ITV police drama The Bill from 2007 to 2010.

Before The Bill, Balfour worked on Absolute Beginners at The Lyric Hammersmith (3 May 2007 – 26 May 2007) as Mr Cool, The Royal Hunt of the Sun at the Royal National Theatre (12 Apr 2006 – 13 May 2006) as Manco, and Market Boy at the Royal National Theatre (6 Jun 2006 – 22 Aug 2006) as Colonel Blood/Flypitcher. From 2015 to 2016, he played the role of Dr. Jermaine Bailey in the ITV soap Emmerdale.

Television

External links

English male television actors
Living people
1978 births
Black British male actors
English people of Nigerian descent